is a Japanese manga series written and illustrated by Hiromu Arakawa. It was serialized in Square Enix's shōnen manga anthology magazine Monthly Shōnen Gangan between July 2001 and June 2010; the publisher later collected the individual chapters into twenty-seven tankōbon volumes. The steampunk world of Fullmetal Alchemist is primarily styled after  the European Industrial Revolution. Set in the early 20th century, in a fictional universe in which alchemy is a widely practiced science, the series follows the journey of two alchemist brothers, Edward and Alphonse Elric, who are searching for the philosopher's stone to restore their bodies after a failed attempt to bring their mother back to life using alchemy.

Fullmetal Alchemist has been adapted into various animetwo television series and two films, all animated by Bonesas well as light novels. The series has generated original video animations, video games, supplementary books, a collectible card game, and a variety of action figures and other merchandise. A live-action film based on the series was released in 2017, and two sequels in 2022. In North America, the manga was localized and published in English by Viz Media. Yen Press has the rights for the digital release of the volumes since 2014.

The manga has sold over 80 million volumes worldwide, making it one of the best-selling manga series. It received the 49th Shogakukan Manga Award for the shōnen category in 2004, the UK's Eagle Award for favorite manga in 2010 and 2011, and the Seiun Award for best science fiction comic in 2011. Reviewers from several media outlets positively critiqued the series, particularly for its character development, action scenes, symbolism, and philosophical references.

Synopsis

Setting
Alchemists have the ability, with the help of patterns called transmutation circles, to create almost anything they desire. However, when they do so, they must provide something of equal value in accordance with the Law of Equivalent Exchange. The only things alchemists are forbidden from transmuting are humans and gold. There has never been a successful human transmutation; those who attempt it lose a part of their body, and the result is an inhuman mass.

All living things possess their own Gate of Truth, and per the Gaea hypothesis, heavenly bodies like planets also have their own Gates of Truth. It is possible to bypass the Law of Equivalent Exchange using a Philosopher's Stone, a red, enigmatic substance. Philosopher's Stones are used to create Homunculi, artificial humans of proud nature who are named after and embody the seven deadly sins; Homunculi have numerous superhuman abilities unique among each other, and look down upon all humanity. With the exception of one, they do not age and can only be killed via the destruction of their Philosopher's Stones.

There are several cities throughout Amestris. Outside of Amestris, there are few named countries, and none are seen in the main story. The main foreign country is Xing. Heavily reminiscent of China, Xing has a complex system of clans and emperors, as opposed to Amestris's government-controlled election of a Führer. It also has its own system of alchemy, called , which is more medical and can be bi-located using kunai; in turn, it is implied that all countries have different forms of alchemy.

Plot

Edward and Alphonse Elric live in Resembool with their mother Trisha and father Van Hohenheim, the latter having left without reason. Trisha soon dies from an illness. After finishing their alchemy training under Izumi Curtis, the Elrics attempt to bring their mother back with alchemy. But the transmutation backfires, and Edward loses his left leg while Alphonse is completely deconstructed. Edward sacrifices his right arm to retrieve Alphonse's soul, binding it to a suit of armor. Edward is invited by Roy Mustang to become a State Alchemist and research a way to restore their bodies, undergoing a painful medical procedure that grants him prosthetic automail limbs. Edward becomes a State Alchemist, with the title of Fullmetal Alchemist. The Elrics spend the next three years searching for the mythical Philosopher's Stone to achieve their goals.

The Elrics are eventually attacked by an Ishbalan serial killer known as Scar, who targets State Alchemists in revenge for his people's genocide in the Ishbalan civil war. Returning to Resembool to have Edward's limbs repaired by their childhood friend and mechanic, Winry Rockbell, the Elrics meet Dr. Marcoh, who provides them with clues to learn that a Philosopher's Stone is created from human souls. They investigate a laboratory in which the Stones were created, but are hindered by the Homunculi. The Elrics decide to visit Izumi, hoping to improve their alchemy. Mustang's friend Maes Hughes continues the Elrics' research and finds out about a government conspiracy, but is killed by the homunculus Envy. The Elrics learn that Izumi also performed human transmutation, having attempted to use alchemy to revive her stillborn child. Alphonse is captured by the homunculus Greed, but is rescued by Amestris' leader King Bradley. Bradley is revealed to be the homunculus Wrath and brings the captured Greed to the Homunculi's creator, Father. When Greed refuses to rejoin his fellow Homunculi, he is reabsorbed by Father. 

After meeting the Xingese prince Lin Yao, who seeks a Philosopher's Stone to cement his position as heir to his country's throne, the Elrics return to Central City, where they learn of Hughes's murder. Lieutenant Maria Ross is framed for Hughes' murder, so Mustang fakes Ross's death and smuggles her out of the country. In encounters with the Homunculi, Mustang kills Lust. Lin captures Gluttony, who swallows Lin, Edward, and Envy into his void-like stomach. They escape from Gluttony's stomach after he takes Alphonse to meet Father, who makes Lin the vessel of Greed. Mustang tries to expose Bradley to the government but finds that the higher officials are complicit in Father's plans. The Elrics and Mustang are released, but warned not to oppose Father, who seeks to use them as "human sacrifices". Meanwhile, Scar heads north with the Xingese princess May Chang, fires the corrupt official Yoki, and kidnaps Dr. Marcoh.

The Elrics head north as well, and reach Fort Briggs, commanded by General Olivier Armstrong. They confront the homunculus Sloth and learn that Father founded Amestris to amass enough population to create a massive Philosopher's Stone. With it, he can achieve godhood by absorbing the being beyond the Gate of Truth on the "Promised Day". Forced to work with Solf Kimblee, a murderous former State Alchemist and ally of the Homunculi, the Elrics turn on him and split up, joined by a reformed Scar, his group, Kimblee's chimera subordinates, and later Lin/Greed. Riza Hawkeye discovers that King Bradley's son Selim is the homunculus Pride. Hohenheim reveals that he was made an immortal when Father arranged the fall of Cselkcess four centuries ago and had been working since then to stop Father.

The Promised Day arrives, with Father planning to use an eclipse and ‘human sacrifices’ — alchemists who have performed human transmutation — to trigger the transmutation, with Wrath and Pride forcing Mustang to perform human transmutation to make him a sacrifice. The Elrics and their comrades battle Father's minions, with Kimblee and almost all of the Homunculi dying. However, Father manages to activate the nationwide transmutation circle and absorbs the superior being. Hohenheim and Scar activate countermeasures, draining much of Father's absorbed souls, and rendering him unstable. The Elrics and their comrades face Father in a final battle, in which Greed sacrifices himself to protect Lin. Alphonse, his armor almost destroyed, sacrifices his soul to restore Edward's right arm. Edward defeats Father, who is dragged into the Gate of Truth, from which he was created. Edward sacrifices his ability to perform alchemy to fully restore Alphonse from an impressed Truth, while Lin receives a Philosopher's Stone. Hohenheim goes to visit Trisha's grave, where he dies peacefully.

The Elrics return home and separate two years later to further research alchemy. Years later, Edward and Winry marry and have two children.

Production

Development
After reading about the concept of the Philosopher's Stone, Arakawa became attracted to the idea of her characters using alchemy in the manga. She started reading books about alchemy, which she found complicated because some books contradict others. Arakawa was attracted more by the philosophical aspects than the practical ones. For the  concept, she was inspired by the work of her parents, who had a farm in Hokkaido and worked hard to earn the money to eat.

Arakawa wanted to integrate social problems into the story. Her research involved watching television news programs and talking to refugees, war veterans and former yakuza. Several plot elements, such as Pinako Rockbell caring for the Elric brothers after their mother dies, and the brothers helping people to understand the meaning of family, expand on these themes. When creating the fictional world of Fullmetal Alchemist, Arakawa was inspired after reading about the Industrial Revolution in Europe; she was amazed by differences in the culture, architecture, and clothes of the era and those of her own culture. She was especially interested in England during this period and incorporated these ideas into the manga. The series has a steampunk setting. The Ishbal region has similarities to the Middle East, with the plot anticipating elements of the Iraq War which later occurred in the real world.

When the manga began serialization, Arakawa was considering several major plot points, including the ending. She wanted the Elric brothers to recover their bodiesat least partly. As the plot continued, she thought that some characters were maturing and decided to change some scenes. Arakawa said the manga authors Suihō Tagawa and Hiroyuki Eto are her main inspirations for her character designs; she describes her artwork as a mix of both of them. She found that the easiest of the series's characters to draw were Alex Louis Armstrong, and the little animals. Arakawa likes dogs so she included several of them in the story. Arakawa made comedy central to the manga's story because she thinks it is intended for entertainment, and tried to minimize sad scenes.

Conclusion
When around forty manga chapters had been published, Arakawa said that as the series was nearing its end and she would try to increase the pace of the narrative. To avoid making some chapters less entertaining than others, unnecessary details from each of them were removed and a climax was developed. The removal of minor details was also necessary because Arakawa had too few pages in Monthly Shōnen Gangan to include all the story content she wanted to add. Some characters' appearances were limited in some chapters. At first, Arakawa thought the series would last twenty-one volumes but the length increased to twenty-seven. Serialization finished after nine years, and Arakawa was satisfied with her work because she had told everything she wanted with the manga.

During the development of the first anime, Arakawa allowed the anime staff to work independently from her and requested a different ending from that of the manga. She said that she would not like to repeat the same ending in both media, and wanted to make the manga longer so she could develop the characters. When watching the ending of the anime, she was amazed about how different the homunculi creatures were from the manga and enjoyed how the staff speculated about the origins of the villains. Because Arakawa helped the Bones staff in the making of the series, she was kept from focusing on the manga's cover illustrations and had little time to make them.

Themes and analysis
The series explores social problems, including discrimination, scientific advancement, political greed, brotherhood, family, and war. Scar's backstory and his hatred of the state military references the Ainu people, who had their land taken by other people. This includes the consequences of guerrilla warfare and the number of violent soldiers a military can have. Some of the people who took the Ainus' land were originally Ainu; this irony is referenced in Scar's use of alchemy to kill alchemists even though it was forbidden in his own religion. The Elrics being orphans and adopted by Pinako Rockbell reflects Arakawa's beliefs about the ways society should treat orphans. The characters' dedication to their occupations reference the need to work for food. The series also explores the concept of equivalent exchange; to obtain something new, one must pay with something of equal value. This is applied by alchemists when creating new materials and is also a philosophical belief the Elric brothers follow.

Publication

Written and drawn by Hiromu Arakawa, Fullmetal Alchemist was serialized in Square Enix's monthly manga magazine Monthly Shōnen Gangan. Its first installment was published in the magazine's August 2001 issue on July 12, 2001. The series finished with the 108th installment in the July 2010 issue of Monthly Shōnen Gangan, published on June 11, 2010. A side-story to the series was published in the October 2010 issue of Monthly Shōnen Gangan on September 11, 2010. In the July 2011 issue of the same magazine, the prototype version of the manga was published. Square Enix compiled the chapters into twenty-seven tankōbon volumes, released from January 22, 2002, to November 22, 2010. A few chapters have been re-released in Japan in two "Extra number" magazines and Fullmetal Alchemist, The First Attack, which features the first nine chapters of the manga and other side stories. Square Enix republished the series into eighteen kanzenban volumes, from June 22, 2011, to September 22, 2012.

In North America, Viz Media licensed the series for an English language release in North America and published the twenty-seven volumes between May 3, 2005, and December 20, 2011. From June 7, 2011, to November 11, 2014, Viz Media published the series in an omnibus format, featuring three volumes in one. In April 2014, Yen Press announced the rights for the digital release of the volumes in North America, and on December 12, 2016, has released the series on the ComiXology website. Viz Media published the eighteen-volume kanzenban edition, as Fullmetal Alchemist: Fullmetal Edition, from May 8, 2018, to August 23, 2022.

Other English localizations were done by Madman Entertainment for Australasia and Chuang Yi in Singapore. The series has been also localized in Polish, French, Portuguese, Italian, and Korean.

Related media

Anime series

Fullmetal Alchemist was adapted into two separate anime series for television: a loose adaption with a mostly anime original story titled Fullmetal Alchemist in 2003–2004, and a retelling that faithfully adapts the original manga in 2009–2010 titled Fullmetal Alchemist: Brotherhood.

Theatrical films

Animation

Two feature-length anime films were produced; Fullmetal Alchemist the Movie: Conqueror of Shamballa, a sequel/conclusion to the 2003 series, and Fullmetal Alchemist: The Sacred Star of Milos, set during the time period of Brotherhood.

Live-action

A live-action film based on the manga was released on November 19, 2017. Fumihiko Sori directed the film. The film stars Ryosuke Yamada as Edward Elric, Tsubasa Honda as Winry Rockbell and Dean Fujioka as Roy Mustang. 

They became available on Netflix on 20 August and 24 September respectively.

Light novels

Square Enix has published a series of six Fullmetal Alchemist Japanese light novels, written by Makoto Inoue. The novels were licensed for an English-language release by Viz Media in North America, with translations by Alexander O. Smith and illustrationsincluding covers and frontispiecesby Arakawa. The novels are spin-offs of the manga series and follow the Elric brothers on their continued quest for the philosopher's stone. The first novel, Fullmetal Alchemist: The Land of Sand, was animated as episodes eleven and twelve of the first anime series. The fourth novel contains an extra story about the military called "Roy's Holiday". Novelizations of the PlayStation 2 games Fullmetal Alchemist and the Broken Angel, Curse of the Crimson Elixir, and The Girl Who Succeeds God have also been written, the first by Makoto Inoue and the rest by Jun Eishima. Two Wii games, Prince of the Dawn and Daughter of the Dusk, were also novelized in one volume by Sōji Machida.

Audio dramas
There have been two series of Fullmetal Alchemist audio dramas. The first volume of the first series, was released before the anime and tells a similar story to the first novel. The second series of audio dramas, available only with purchases of Shōnen Gangan, consists of two stories in this series, each with two parts. The first, was included in Shōnen Gangan April and May 2004 issues; the second story, was issued in the November and December 2004 issues.

Video games
Video games based on Fullmetal Alchemist have been released. The storylines of the games often diverge from those of the anime and manga, and feature original characters. Square Enix has released three role-playing games (RPG)—Fullmetal Alchemist and the Broken Angel, Curse of the Crimson Elixir, and Kami o Tsugu Shōjo. In Japan, Bandai released an RPG  for the PlayStation Portable on May 20, 2010. Bandai also released a fighting game, Dream Carnival, for the PlayStation 2. Destineer released a game based on the trading card game in North America for the Nintendo DS. Of the seven games made in Japan, Broken Angel, Curse of the Crimson Elixir, and Dual Sympathy have seen international releases. For the Wii,  was released in Japan on August 13, 2009. A direct sequel of the game, was released on December 10, 2009, for the same console.

Funimation licensed the franchise to create a new series of Fullmetal Alchemist-related video games to be published by Destineer Publishing Corporation in the United States. Destineer released its first Fullmetal Alchemist game for the Nintendo DS, a translation of Bandai's Dual Sympathy, on December 15, 2006, and said that they plan to release further titles. On February 19, 2007, Destineer announced the second game in its Fullmetal Alchemist series, the Fullmetal Alchemist Trading Card Game, which was released on October 15, 2007. A second game for the PlayStation Portable titled  was released in Japan on October 15, 2009. A European release of the game, published by Namco Bandai Games, was announced on March 4, 2010. The massively multiplayer online role-playing game MapleStory also received special in-game items based on the anime series. For the 20th Anniversary of the series, Square Enix announced Fullmetal Alchemist Mobile, which was released for iOS and Android devices on August 4, 2022.

Arakawa oversaw the story and designed the characters for the RPG games, while Bonesthe studio responsible for the anime seriesproduced several animation sequences. The developers looked at other titlesspecifically Square Enix's action role-playing game Kingdom Hearts and other games based on manga series, such as Dragon Ball, Naruto or One Piece gamesfor inspiration. The biggest challenge was to make a "full-fledged" game rather than a simple character-based one. Tomoya Asano, the assistant producer for the games, said that development took more than a year, unlike most character-based games.

Art and guidebooks

The Fullmetal Alchemist has received several artbooks. Three artbooks called  were released by Square Enix; two of those were released in the US by Viz Media. The first artbook contains illustrations made between May 2001 to April 2003, spanning the first six manga volumes, while the second has illustrations from September 2003 to October 2005, spanning the next six volumes. The last one includes illustrations from the remaining volumes.

The manga also has three guidebooks; each of them contains timelines, guides to the Elric brothers' journey, and gaiden chapters that were never released in manga volumes. Only the first guidebook was released by Viz Media, titled Fullmetal Alchemist Profiles. A guidebook titled , which contains post-manga story information, was released in Japan on July 29, 2011.

Merchandise
Action figures, busts, and statues from the Fullmetal Alchemist anime and manga have been produced by toy companies, including Medicom and Southern Island. Medicom has created high end deluxe vinyl figures of the characters from the anime. These figures are exclusively distributed in the United States and UK by Southern Island. Southern Island released its own action figures of the main characters in 2007, and a 12" statuette was scheduled for release the same year. Southern Island has since gone bankrupt, putting the statuette's release in doubt. A trading card game was first published in 2005 in the United States by Joyride Entertainment. Since then, six expansions have been released. The card game was withdrawn on July 11, 2007. Destineer released a Nintendo DS adaptation of the game on October 15, 2007.

Reception

Manga
Fullmetal Alchemist was one of the Manga Division's Jury Recommended Works at the 8th and 11th installments of Japan Media Arts Festival in 2004 and 2007, respectively. Along with Yakitate!! Japan, the series won the 49th Shogakukan Manga Award for the shōnen category in 2004. It won the public voting for Eagle Award's "Favourite Manga" in 2010 and 2011. The series won the "Shonen Tournament 2009" by the editorial staff of the French website manga-news. The manga also received the 42nd Seiun Award for best science fiction comic in 2011. Arakawa also received the New Artist Prize in the fifteenth Tezuka Osamu Cultural Prizes for the manga series in 2011. Fullmetal Alchemist ranked 3rd on the first annual Tsutaya Comic Awards' All-Time Best Section in 2017. The manga was nominated for the Grand Prize of the 10th Sense of Gender Award in 2010.

In a survey from Oricon in 2009, Fullmetal Alchemist ranked ninth as the manga that fans wanted to be turned into a live-action film. The series is also popular with amateur writers who produce dōjinshi (fan fiction) that borrows characters from the series. In the Japanese market Super Comic City, there have been over 1,100 dōjinshi based on Fullmetal Alchemist, some of which focused on romantic interactions between Edward Elric and Roy Mustang. Anime News Network said the series had the same impact in Comiket 2004 as several female fans were seen there writing dōjinshi. On TV Asahi's Manga Sōsenkyo 2021 poll, in which 150.000 people voted for their top 100 manga series, Fullmetal Alchemist ranked ninth.

Sales
The series has become one of Square Enix's best-performing properties, along with Final Fantasy and Dragon Quest. With the release of volume 27, the manga sold over 50 million copies in Japan. As of January 10, 2010, every volume of the manga has sold over a million copies each in Japan. Square Enix reported that the series had sold 70.3 million copies worldwide as of April 25, 2018, 16.4 million of those outside Japan. As of July 2021, the manga had 80 million copies in circulation worldwide. The series is also one of Viz Media's best sellers, appearing in "BookScan's Top 20 Graphic Novels" and the "USA Today Booklist". It was featured in the Diamond Comic Distributors' polls of graphic novels and The New York Times Best Seller Manga list. The English release of the manga's first volume was the top-selling graphic novel during 2005.

During 2008, volumes 19 and 20 sold over a million copies, ranking as the 10th and 11th best seller comics in Japan respectively. In the first half of 2009, it ranked as the seventh best-seller in Japan, having sold over 3 million copies. Volume 21 ranked fourth, with more than a million copies sold and volume 22 ranked sixth with a similar number of sold copies. Producer Kouji Taguchi of Square Enix said that Volume 1's initial sales were 150,000 copies; this grew to 1.5 million copies after the first anime aired. Prior to the second anime's premiere, each volume sold about 1.9 million copies, and then it changed to 2.1 million copies.

Critical response
Fullmetal Alchemist has generally been well received by critics. Though the first volumes were thought to be formulaic, critics said that the series grows in complexity as it progresses. Jason Thompson called Arakawa one of the best at creating action scenes and praised the series for having great female characters despite being a boys' manga. He also noted how the story gets dark by including real-world issues such as government corruption, war and genocide. Thompson finished by stating that Fullmetal Alchemist "will be remembered as one of the classic shonen manga series of the 2000s." Melissa Harper of Anime News Network praised Arakawa for keeping all of her character designs unique and distinguishable, despite many of them wearing the same basic uniforms. IGN's Hilary Goldstein wrote that the characterization of Edward balances between being a "typical clever kid" and a "stubborn kid", allowing him to float between the comical moments and the underlying drama without seeming false. Holly Ellingwood for Active Anime praised the development of the characters in the manga and their beliefs changing during the story, forcing them to mature. Mania Entertainment's Jarred Pine said that the manga can be enjoyed by anybody who has watched the first anime, despite the similarities in the first chapters. Like other reviewers, Pine praised the dark mood of the series and the way it balances the humor and action scenes. Pine also praised the development of characters who have few appearances in the first anime. In a review of volume 14, Sakura Eriesalso of Mania Entertainmentliked the revelations, despite the need to resolve several story arcs. She also praised the development of the homunculi, such as the return of Greed, as well as their fights.

See also

 List of Square Enix manga franchises
 List of Square Enix video game franchises

References

External links

 Official Gangan Online Fullmetal Alchemist homepage (in Japanese)
 Official Gangan Fullmetal Alchemist manga and novel website  
 
 

Fullmetal Alchemist
2001 manga
2003 Japanese novels
2010 comics endings
Adventure anime and manga
Anime and manga about revenge
Comics set in a fictional country
Coming-of-age anime and manga
Dark fantasy anime and manga
Fiction about alchemy
Fiction about government
Gangan Comics manga
Genocide in fiction
Light novels
Madman Entertainment manga
Manga adapted into films
Military anime and manga
Philosophical anime and manga
Prosthetics in fiction
Seven deadly sins in popular culture
Shōnen manga
Square Enix franchises
Steampunk anime and manga
Viz Media manga
Viz Media novels
War in anime and manga
Winner of Tezuka Osamu Cultural Prize (New Artist Prize)
Winners of the Shogakukan Manga Award for shōnen manga
Yen Press titles